Kassila may refer to:
 Matti Kassila (1924–2018), Finnish director
 , a village in Senegal